A feud is long-running argument or conflict between two parties.

Feud may also refer to:

 Fief or feudum, land held under the feudal system

Film
 The Feud (1910 film), an American silent film
 The Feud (1919 film), a lost silent film drama
 The Feud, a 1926 American film featuring Earle Foxe
 The Feud, a 1955 Hong Kong film featuring Kenneth Tsang
 The Feud, a 1989 American film based on Thomas Berger's novel (see below), directed by Bill D'Elia
 The Feud, a 2019 American film directed by Randall Maclowry for the television series American Experience

Television
 Feud (professional wrestling), a storyline rivalry in professional wrestling
 Feud (TV series), an American anthology TV series

Episodes
 "Feud" (The Brak Show)
 "Feud" (The Elephant Princess)
 "Feud" (Glee)
 "Feud" (Lassie)
 "Feud" (Watching Ellie)
 "The Feud" (The Army Game)
 "The Feud" (Arthur)
 "The Feud" (Blondie)
 "The Feud" (Date with the Angels)
 "The Feud" (Hidden Hills)
 "The Feud" (Mad About You)
 "The Feud" (Memphis Beat)
 "The Feud" (Modern Family)
 "The Feud" (Reba)
 "The Feud" (The Roy Rogers Show)
 "The Feud" (Wildfire)
 "The Feud!" (Voltron: Legendary Defender)

Other media
 Feud (video game), a 1987 computer game for 8- and 16-bit home computers
 The Feud (novel), a 1983 novel by Thomas Berger

See also 
 Family Feud (disambiguation)
 Feudal (disambiguation)
 Blood Feud (disambiguation)